Association of Nurses in AIDS Care (ANAC) is a national nursing organization in the United States which specializes in the care of individuals infected with HIV. It is based in Akron, Ohio, and was founded in 1987.

Its official journal is the Journal of the Association of Nurses in AIDS Care (JANAC), which is published on behalf of ANAC by Elsevier.

References

External links
 

Organizations established in 1987
HIV/AIDS organizations in the United States
Nursing organizations in the United States
1987 establishments in Ohio
Organizations based in Akron, Ohio
Medical and health organizations based in Ohio